Octagón Jr. may refer to:

Kalisto (wrestler) (born 1986), first Octagón Jr. (2012)
Flamita (born 1994), second Octagón Jr. (2016)
Golden Magic (born 1990), third and current Octagón Jr. (2019 )